Grace Bible College may refer to:

 Grace Christian University, known from 1961 to 2018 as "Grace Bible College"
 Grace Bible College (India)
 Ernest Angley's Online Bible College, formerly known as "Grace Bible College"
 Grace Bible College (Kenya), associated with the Africa Evangelical Presbyterian Church